Série noire is a Quebec Comedy drama thriller series which was originally broadcast on Radio-Canada and TOU.TV in 2014–2015. The series centres on Denis (François Létourneau) and Patrick (Vincent-Guillaume Otis), the writers of a popular but critically reviled crime drama series, La loi de la justice, as they embark on a crime spree following the end of the show's first season in the hope of accumulating the personal experience necessary to make the writing more realistic in the show's second season.

The show was critically acclaimed and won eleven Gémeaux awards in 2014 and four Gémeaux awards in 2016.

References

External links 
 Série Noire on Radio-Canada

Television shows set in Montreal
Television shows filmed in Montreal
2014 Canadian television series debuts
2016 Canadian television series endings
Ici Radio-Canada Télé original programming
Prix Gémeaux-winning shows
2010s Canadian crime drama television series
2010s Canadian comedy-drama television series